The 2021 Brownlow Medal was the 94th year the award was presented to the player adjudged the best and fairest player during the Australian Football League (AFL) home-and-away season. For the second year in a row, due to the travel restrictions imposed as a result of the COVID-19 pandemic in Australia, the ceremony was not be held in Melbourne but instead a mainly made-for-television event, with players attending their nearest function in four different states. With Perth hosting the 2021 AFL Grand Final, the main function was held at Optus Stadium on Sunday, 19 September 2021.

Ollie Wines of the Port Adelaide Football Club won the medal with 36 votes, equalling the record set by Dustin Martin in 2017 Brownlow Medal for most votes in a season under the 3–2–1 voting system.

Leading vote-getters

Voting procedure
The three field umpires (those umpires who control the flow of the game, as opposed to goal or boundary umpires) confer after each match and award three votes, two votes, and one vote to the players they regard as the best, second-best and third-best in the match, respectively. The votes are kept secret until the awards night, and they are read and tallied on the evening.

References

2021 Australian Football League season
2021